Kalutara Balika Vidyalaya is a Buddhist girls' school in Kalutara, Sri Lanka. It was founded in 1942 by Sir Cyril De Zoysa. It became a national school on 9 March 1998.

Overview 
Kalutara Balika Vidyalaya, as per the Education Ministry classification, is an IAB category National school. An IAB category school has classes from Grade 1 (or at least Grade 5) up to Grade 13. It must also have an Advanced Level Science stream. A National school is managed by the Ministry of Education, as opposed to Provincial schools, which are managed by provincial authorities. Being a government school, Kalutara Balika Vidyalaya follows government educational policy.

Administration 
With over 3,000 students, 112 teachers, and another 10 supportive staff, Kalutara Balika Vidyalaya has decentralised administrative requirements for smooth management. The Principal, with assistance from the Vice-Principal, manages the entire school through delegation of powers to different sectional heads – A Deputy Principal for the Primary (Grades 1 – 5) section, a Deputy Principal for the Middle-school (Grades 6 – 9), an Assistant Principal for Grade 10 and 11, and another Deputy Principal for Grade 12 and 13. Assistant Principals are also appointed to handle other specific areas – namely: Co-curricular activities, finance, infrastructure, and academic affairs.

Admission 
Admission of students to Kalutara Balika Vidyalaya is at 3 levels. Nearly 200 children are selected for admission at the Grade 1 level. Selections are to be made strictly in terms of circular issued by the Ministry of Education.

The next level of admission is at Grade 6. About 25 Sinhala medium students are selected on the basis of the year 5 Bursaries and Placement Examination. Students hail from all corners of the island; hence it is the school's responsibility to provide accommodation for at least some of them.

The third and final level of admission is Grade 12. A small number of students are admitted depending on the number of vacancies based on their O Level results, sports, and other achievements. Priority is also given to students who do not have A Level facilities in their current schools.

Infrastructure 
In addition to several long-standing structural features, several new buildings have been added to the Kalutara Balika Vidyalaya list of facilities. A complete Information Technology Centre is the latest integral in the Balika facilities of two science laboratories and an auditorium. Several new buildings have merged into the distinctively impressive architectural skyline of the Kalutara Balika Vidyalaya.

External links 
 Official Website

National schools in Sri Lanka
Schools in Kalutara
Buddhist schools in Sri Lanka